2 is the second album from Belgian drum and bass producer Netsky. It was released on 25 June 2012 through Hospital Records on multiple formats, including digital download, CD and vinyl. The album includes the singles "Give & Take", "Come Alive", "Love Has Gone", and the deluxe edition of the album includes the single "We Can Only Live Today (Puppy)". It became Netsky's first number one album topping the Belgian Albums Chart.

Singles
 "Give & Take" was released as the lead single from the album on 16 January 2012.
 "Come Alive" was released as the second single from the album on 21 May 2012.
 "Love Has Gone" was released as the third single from the album on 30 July 2012.
 "We Can Only Live Today (Puppy) was released as the first single from the deluxe edition of the album 2 Deluxe on 5 November 2012. It is the fourth and final single from the album overall.

Other songs
"When Darkness Falls" was released as the iTunes Single of the Week for limited free download on the week of 30 June 2012.

Music video were given to the songs "Puppy" (20 June 2012), "No Beginning" (10 July 2012), "Squad Up" (28 August 2012), "The Whistle Song" (22 March 2013), and "When Darkness Falls" (16 April 2013), as well as all of the singles. The videos were released through the official Hospital Records YouTube channel.

Track listing

Standard edition

Vinyl
"Love Has Gone"
"911"
"Jetlag Funk"
"No Beginning" (Downbeat Mix)
"Drawing Straws"
"Detonate"
"Get Away From Here" (Instrumental)
"Give & Take"

Charts

Weekly charts

Year-end charts

References

2012 albums
Netsky (musician) albums
Hospital Records albums